The Downtown Winter Haven Historic District is a U.S. historic district (designated as such on February 4, 2002) located in Winter Haven, Florida. The district is bounded by roughly Avenue A Northwest, Avenue A Southwest, 3rd and 5th Streets. It contains 26 historic buildings.

Gallery

References

External links
 Polk County listings at National Register of Historic Places

National Register of Historic Places in Polk County, Florida
Winter Haven, Florida
Historic districts on the National Register of Historic Places in Florida